Ad-Dhahiriya (also Az-Zahiriya) is a Palestinian city in the Hebron Governorate of the State of Palestine, 23 km southwest of the city of Hebron in the southern West Bank. According to the Palestinian Central Bureau of Statistics, ad-Dhahiriya had a population of 38.002 in 2016.

History

According to Conder and Kitchener Ad-Dhahiriya was probably the site of the ancient biblical town of Debir. They found the village undermined by caves. In the centre of Ad-Dhahiriya was a tower, which appeared to be from before the Crusader era, possibly from early Christian or Roman period.

Local tradition, supported by archaeology, have that ad-Dhahiriya was founded by Baibars (1223/1228 – 1277).

Ottoman era
In the various Ottoman census in the sixteenth century, Darusiyya was noted as located in the nahiya of Halil. In the 932 AH/1525-1526 CE census, the villagers also cultivated the fields at Bayt Hawran. In 961/1553-1554, it was reported as derelict, while in 970/1562-1563 and 1005/1596-1597, it was reported as a village.

In 1838, Edward Robinson noted edh-Dhoheriyeh as a Muslim village, located southwest of el-Khalil. Robinson further remarked: "A castle or fortress apparently once stood here; the remains of a square tower are still to be seen, now used as a dwelling; and the door-ways of many hovels are of hewn stone with arches. It would seem to have been one of the line of small fortresses, which apparently once existed all along the southern border of Palestine. The village contains, according to the government census, one hundred full-grown men; of whom thirty-eight had been taken at three separate times for the Egyptian army. Though half in ruins, it is yet rich in flocks and herds, and has at least hundred camels. The inhabitants are Hudhr, or townsmen; and belonging to the party called Keis. Most of the villagers in this quarter are of this party; as well as some of the Bedawin."

In 1856, a Scottish clergyman, Horatius Bonar described the village and its ruined castle: "Suddenly, at an abrupt elbow of the ravine, we are relieved by seeing the old castle, perched on its rocky height well in the setting sun; the poor village, which seems to hang about it, with its square yellow huts, rather helps, at this distance, to improve its appearance, and to give dignity to its towers and broken ramparts. From this point it looks much bolder and substantial than it is; not so isolated as El-Aujeh, which we passed some days ago, but well-set upon yon craggy perch. Like most of its fellow castles in the east and border “peels” in the north, it has seen better days, and has at one time, been a noble stronghold for Romans, or Crusaders, or Turks..."

In 1863 Victor Guérin visited the place, and found that many of the men had fled, mostly further south in tents, in order to avoid conscription. He noted one building, measuring sixteen steps on each side which was built in beautiful stone. It contained several vaulted chambers, and was the home of one of the sheikhs of the village. 
Several other private houses were also built with fine materials, from old buildings; some even seemed to date, either entirely or only in their lower courses from the Roman period.

An Ottoman village list of about 1870 indicated 57 houses and a population of 206, though the population count included men, only.

According to the PEF's Survey of Western Palestine, (SWP), the village had a population of 300-400 in 1874. In 1877, it was deserted due to "encroachment of the Arabs into the country of the fellahin".

British Mandate era
In the 1922 census of Palestine conducted by the British Mandate authorities, Ad-Dhahiriya (called: AI Dahriyeh) had an entirely Muslim population of 2,266 inhabitants, increasing in the 1931 census to 2,930, still all Muslim, in 603 houses.

In the 1945 statistics the population of Ad-Dhahiriya was 3,760, all Muslims, who owned 60,585 dunams of land according to an official land and population survey. 166 dunams were plantations and irrigable land, 54,205 for cereals, while 284 dunams were built-up (urban) land.

Jordanian era
In the wake of the 1948 Arab–Israeli War, and after the 1949 Armistice Agreements, Ad-Dhahiriya came under Jordanian  rule. The first village council was established in 1963.

The Jordanian census of 1961 found 4,199 inhabitants in Ad-Dhahiriya.

1967, aftermath
Since the Six-Day War in 1967, Ad-Dhahiriya has been under Israeli occupation. The population in the 1967 census conducted by the Israeli authorities was 4,875. Since 1995, it has been governed by the Palestinian National Authority as part of Area A of the West Bank.

In 1996, the Palestinian Authority appointed a municipal council. In 2004, a 13-member council was elected with paid employees.

The primary health care facilities for the municipality are designated by the Ministry of Health as level 3.

According to the Office for the Coordination of Humanitarian Affairs (OCHA), the entrance to the village was closed by an IDF earth mound on 14 April 2005, forcing all Palestinians in the area to travel via Dura.

References

Bibliography

   
  (+special papers p. 36) 

 
   
  
 
  
  
 
 (contains several striking costumes from Ad-Dhahiriya reproduced from the Rajab Collection, Kuwait.)

External links
Welcome To The City of al-Dhahiriya
Al Dahriya, Welcome to Palestine
Survey of Western Palestine, Map 25: IAA,  Wikimedia commons
Adh Dhahiriya Town (Fact Sheet), Applied Research Institute–Jerusalem (ARIJ)
Dhahiriya Town Profile, ARIJ
Dhahiriya aerial photo, ARIJ
The priorities and needs for development in Adh Dhahiriya town based on the community and local authorities’ assessment, ARIJ

Cities in the West Bank
Hebron Governorate
Municipalities of West Bank